Sharp Mary Birch Hospital for Women & Newborns, part of Sharp HealthCare, is a 206-bed, not for profit hospital. Located in San Diego, California, Sharp Mary Birch Hospital delivers more babies than any other hospital in California.

History
In 1992, Sharp Mary Birch opened as the largest and most extensive freestanding center for women's health in Southern California.

In December 2018, the world's smallest surviving baby was born at Sharp Mary Birch Hospital for Women & Newborns. Born at only 8.6 ounces (245 grams), "Saybie" weighed only as much as a large apple. After a nearly five-month-long stay in the Neonatal Intensive Care Unit, she was discharged home as a healthy 5-pound infant.

Hospital features
Sharp Mary Birch caters to the needs of women, expectant mothers and babies. It has one of the largest Level III NICU in Southern California. More babies are delivered at Sharp Mary Birch every year than anywhere else in California. Each year, the hospital delivers approximately 9,000 babies. It has 206 beds, including 84 NICU beds.

Sharp Mary Birch offers labor and delivery suites for new moms, as well as a shop selling breast-feeding accessories and more information and items for women and mothers.

Awards
In 2013, Sharp Mary Birch earned a designation as a Center of Excellence in Minimally Invasive Gynecologic Surgery by the American Academy of Gynecologic Laparoscopists.

References

External links
 

Hospital buildings completed in 1992
Hospitals in San Diego
Maternity hospitals in the United States
Hospitals established in 1992
1992 establishments in California
Women in California